Rolandas Bernatonis (born 22 January 1987) is a Lithuanian handball player who currently plays for DVTK-Eger and the Lithuania national team.

He was one of the best foreign scorers in the 2014–15 and 2015–16 seasons of Liga ASOBAL, scoring a total of 240 goals in 48 games.

References

Lithuanian male handball players
Sportspeople from Kaunas
Living people
1987 births
Expatriate handball players
Lithuanian expatriate sportspeople in Spain
Lithuanian expatriate sportspeople in Romania
Lithuanian expatriate sportspeople in Hungary
Liga ASOBAL players
BM Granollers players